Recklinghausen I is an electoral constituency (German: Wahlkreis) represented in the Bundestag. It elects one member via first-past-the-post voting. Under the current constituency numbering system, it is designated as constituency 121. It is located in the Ruhr region of North Rhine-Westphalia, comprising the southeastern part of the Recklinghausen district.

Recklinghausen I was created for the inaugural 1949 federal election. Since 2005, it has been represented by Frank Schwabe of the Social Democratic Party (SPD).

Geography
Recklinghausen I is located in the Ruhr region of North Rhine-Westphalia. As of the 2021 federal election, it comprises the municipalities of Castrop-Rauxel, Recklinghausen, and Waltrop from the Recklinghausen district.

History
Recklinghausen I was created in 1949, then known as Recklinghausen-Stadt. It acquired its current name in the 1980 West German federal election.

In the 1949 election, it was North Rhine-Westphalia constituency 42 in the numbering system. From 1953 through 1961, it was number 101. From 1965 through 1976, it was number 100. From 1980 through 1998, it was number 91. From 2002 through 2009, it was number 122. Since 2013, it has been number 121.

Originally, the constituency comprised only the city of Recklinghausen. From 1965 through 1976, it comprised the independent city of Recklinghausen and the municipalities of Waltrop, Henrichenburg, Datteln, Oer-Erkenschwick, and Haltern from the Recklinghausen district. It acquired its current borders in the 1980 election.

Members
The constituency has been held by the Social Democratic Party (SPD) during all but three Bundestag terms since 1949. It was first represented by Bernhard Winkelheide of the Christian Democratic Union (CDU) from 1949 to 1961. Heinrich Auge of the SPD was elected in 1961 and served two terms, followed by Erich Wolfram from 1969 to 1987. Heinz-Werner Meyer served a single term from 1987 to 1990. He was succeeded by Jochen Welt from 1990 to 2005. Frank Schwabe was elected in 2005, and re-elected in 2009, 2013, 2017, and 2021.

Election results

2021 election

2017 election

2013 election

2009 election

References

Federal electoral districts in North Rhine-Westphalia
1949 establishments in West Germany
Constituencies established in 1949
Recklinghausen (district)